Abacetus audax is a species of ground beetle in the subfamily Pterostichinae. It was described by Laferte-Senectere in 1853 and is found in Chad and Cote d'Ivoire.

References

audax
Beetles described in 1853
Insects of West Africa
Insects of Central Africa